Rosalina Anastasia Santoro Estrada (born 30 July 2002) is an Ecuadorian footballer who plays as a forward for American college team Alcorn State Lady Braves and the Ecuador women's national under-20 team. Born in the United States, she has previously played for the senior Dominican Republic women's national team.

Early life
Santoro was born and raised in Pembroke Pines, Florida to a Dominican father of Italian descent and an Ecuadorian mother.

High school and college career
Santoro has attended the West Broward High School in Pembroke Pines, Florida and the Alcorn State University in Lorman, Mississippi.

International career
Santoro made her senior debut for the Dominican Republic on 18 February 2021 as a 86th-minute substitution in a 1–1 friendly home draw against Puerto Rico. In December 2021, she participated in a microcycle for the Ecuador women's national under-20 team.

References

2002 births
Living people
People with acquired Ecuadorian citizenship
Ecuadorian women's footballers
Women's association football forwards
Ecuadorian people of Dominican Republic descent
Sportspeople of Dominican Republic descent
Ecuadorian people of Italian descent
Sportspeople of Italian descent
Citizens of the Dominican Republic through descent
Dominican Republic women's footballers
Dominican Republic women's international footballers
Dominican Republic people of Italian descent
Dominican Republic people of Ecuadorian descent
Sportspeople of Ecuadorian descent
Sportspeople from Pembroke Pines, Florida
Soccer players from Florida
American women's soccer players
Alcorn State Lady Braves soccer players
American sportspeople of Dominican Republic descent
American people of Italian descent
American people of Ecuadorian descent